Juan Balcells was the defending champion but lost in the quarterfinals to Albert Montañés.

Younes El Aynaoui won in the final 7–6(7–5), 7–6(7–2) against Montañés.

Seeds
A champion seed is indicated in bold text while text in italics indicates the round in which that seed was eliminated.

  Andrei Pavel (second round)
  Albert Portas (second round)
  Alberto Martín (first round)
  Andreas Vinciguerra (first round)
  Galo Blanco (first round)
  Jérôme Golmard (semifinals)
  Younes El Aynaoui (champion)
  Juan Balcells (quarterfinals)

Draw

External links
 2001 Gelsor Open Romania draw

2001 Singles
Singles
2001 in Romanian tennis